Hodsock is a civil parish in the Bassetlaw District of Nottinghamshire, England.  The parish contains 17 listed buildings that are recorded in the National Heritage List for England.   Of these, one is listed at Grade I, the highest of the three grades, and the others are at Grade II, the lowest grade.  The parish is almost entirely rural, containing no substantial settlements.  The most important building in the parish is a 16th-century gatehouse, which is listed, together with its associated country house.  The other listed buildings consist of houses and associated structures, farmhouses and farm buildings, a former watermill, a bridge and a war memorial.



Key

Buildings

References

Citations

Sources

 

Lists of listed buildings in Nottinghamshire